The 1889 Princeton Tigers football team was an American football team that represented Princeton University as an independent during the 1889 college football season. The team compiled a perfect 10–0 record, shut out six of ten opponents, and outscored all opponents by a total of 484 to 29. The team captain and quarterback was Edgar Allan Poe, the second cousin of his namesake, the writer Edgar Allan Poe.

There was no contemporaneous system in 1889 for determining a national champion. However, Princeton was retroactively named as the national champion by the Billingsley Report, Helms Athletic Foundation, Houlgate System, National Championship Foundation, and Parke H. Davis. It was Princeton's 15th national championship.

Five players from the 1889 Princeton team were selected by Caspar Whitney for the first All-America college football team: quarterback Edgar Allen Poe; halfback Roscoe Channing; fullback Knowlton "Snake" Ames; tackle Hector Cowan; and center William George. Ames and Cowan were later inducted into the College Football Hall of Fame.

Schedule

References

Princeton
Princeton Tigers football seasons
College football national champions
College football undefeated seasons
Princeton Tigers football